Plantation Harbor is the second solo studio album by American rock musician Joe Vitale, released in 1981 by Asylum Records. The album was his only album to chart, peaking at No. 181 on the U.S. Billboard 200.

The album was released at the height of the popularity of the new wave music movement. The song "Lady on the Rock" received some airplay in the US on album-oriented rock radio, but the album was generally poorly received.

The album features guest performances by Joe Walsh, Don Felder, Timothy B. Schmit, Stephen Stills, Graham Nash, Mickey Thomas, Paul Harris, George "Chocolate" Perry, Joe Lala, and Marilyn Martin, and horns arranged by James Pankow.

Composition
The instrumental "Theme from Cabin Weirdos" is another in the series of "Weirdo" instrumentals (such as "Theme from Boat Weirdos," "Theme from Island Weirdos," etc.) that Joe Walsh and Vitale had on previous albums.

The Echo drums on the track "Theme from Cabin Weirdos" were recorded on top of Mount Mitchell, the highest peak of the Appalachian Mountains and the highest peak in the eastern United States; the mountain reaches an elevation of 6,684 ft (2,037 m).

Recording
In 1981, Bill Szymczyk had produced the Who's Face Dances, and Vitale had made commitments to Who bassist John Entwistle's fifth solo studio album Too Late the Hero (which he had been committed to since 1979) with Joe Walsh. Vitale also made commitments to Walsh's fifth solo studio album There Goes the Neighborhood (1981), all of which tied into Vitale and Szymczyk's commitments of this album.

Critical reception

In a retrospective review for AllMusic, critic Rob Caldwell called the album "a dated sounding, but decent, collection of light and airy late 1970s/early 1980s rock." He likened it to Joe Walsh's solo albums, but disclaimed that it does not have the "strong hooks or the bite."

Track listing
All songs written by Joe Vitale, except where noted.

Side one
"Plantation Harbor" – 4:14
"Never Gonna Leave You Alone (Crazy 'Bout You Baby)" – 5:04
"Laugh-Laugh" – 4:29
"Man Gonna Love You" – 5:01

Side two
"Theme from Cabin Weirdos" – 2:48
"Lady on the Rock" (Vitale, Bill Szymczyk, Stephen Stills) – 5:30
"Bamboo Jungle" – 3:16
"Sailor Man" – 3:58
"I'm Flyin'" – 5:17

Personnel
Credits are adapted from the album's liner notes.

Musicians
 Joe Vitale – vocals (track 1-4, 6-9); drums, percussion (track 1-9); clavinet (track 1-3, 4, 7-9); flute (track 3, 7); organ (track 1, 2); electric piano (track 4, 5); grand piano (track 5); synthesizer (track 1, 2, 6-9); vibraphone (track 3)
 Joe Walsh – guitar (track 1-3, 6-9)
 Don Felder – guitar (track 4, 6, 8)
 Willie "Little Beaver" Hale – rhythm guitar (track 1)
 George "Chocolate" Perry – bass guitar (track 1-4, 6-9); backing vocals (track 1, 2, 7)
 Walter Parazaider – tenor saxophone (track 8)
 Marty Grebb – alto saxophone and solo saxophone (track 8)
 Paul Harris – clavinet (track 6); piano (track 2, 3, 8)
 Bob Mayo – lead clavinet (track 7); piano (track 9)
 Jimmy Pankow – trombone (track 8)
 Lee Loughnane – trumpet (track 8)
 Graham Nash – piano (track 9)
 Joe Lala – congas (track 3)
 Marilyn "Mini" Martin – backing vocals (track 1, 4, 6)
 Timothy B. Schmit – backing vocals (track 3, 8)
 Joan Perry – backing vocals (track 1, 2)
 Stephen Stills – backing vocals (track 9)
 Mickey Thomas – backing vocals (track 2)
 Greg Droman – backing vocals (track 4)
 Ricky "Goona" Washington – backing vocals (track 1, 2)

Production
 Bill Szymczyk – producer; engineer; inner sleeve photography; album cover concept
 Buddy Thornton – assistant engineer; maintenance engineer; truck driver; C.B. Maintenance; Mobile Monsters; fish dinners; Space Invaders maintenance; console customizing; one pound-o-lony
 Allan Blazek – assistant engineer
 James Geddes – assistant engineer
 Ed Mashal – assistant engineer
 Jay Parti – assistant engineer
 Jimmy Patterson – assistant engineer
 John Swain – assistant engineer
 Ted Jensen – mastering (at Sterling Sound, New York City)
 Jimmie "Jim" Haskell – string arrangements
 Jimmy Pankow – horn arrangements
 Paul Harris – horn arrangements
 Sid Sharp – concertmaster
 Jimmy Wachtel – art direction; design
 Joe Vitale – album cover concept; inner sleeve photography
 Scherley Busch – cover photography
 Jage Jackson – inner sleeve photography
 Buddy Thornton – inner sleeve photography

Notes
Stephen Stills, Jimmy Pankow, Lee Loughnane, Walt Parazaider and Marty Grebb appear courtesy of Columbia Records

Chart performance
Album – Billboard (North America)

Singles – Billboard (North America)

References

External links

1981 albums
Joe Vitale (musician) albums
Albums produced by Bill Szymczyk
Albums with cover art by Jimmy Wachtel
Asylum Records albums
Warner Music Group albums
Wounded Bird Records albums
Elektra Records albums
Rhino Records albums